Robert Copeland McKenzie was a Scottish amateur footballer who played in the Scottish League for Queen's Park as a right half. He was capped by Ireland at amateur level.

Personal life 
McKenzie served as a captain in the Royal Army Medical Corps during the First World War.

References

Year of birth missing
Scottish footballers
Scottish Football League players
British Army personnel of World War I
Association football wing halves
Queen's Park F.C. players
Royal Army Medical Corps officers
Place of death missing
Date of death missing
Greenock Morton F.C. players
Clyde F.C. players
NIFL Premiership players
Linfield F.C. players
Northern Ireland amateur international footballers